The 2017 J&T Banka Prague Open was a professional tennis tournaments played on outdoor clay courts. It was the 8th edition of the tournament, and its second as part of the International category of the 2017 WTA Tour. It took place at the Sparta Prague Tennis Club in Prague, Czech Republic, from 1 to 6 May 2017.

Points distribution

Singles main draw entrants

Seeds 

 1 Rankings as of 24 April 2017.

Other entrants 
The following players received wildcards into the singles main draw:
  Jana Čepelová
  Jelena Janković
  Markéta Vondroušová

The following players received entry from the qualifying draw:
  Mona Barthel
  Beatriz Haddad Maia
  Lucie Hradecká
  Natalia Vikhlyantseva

Withdrawals 
Before the tournament
  Mandy Minella → replaced by  Camila Giorgi
  Naomi Osaka → replaced by  Evgeniya Rodina
  Louisa Chirico → replaced by  Danka Kovinić

During the tournament
  Lucie Šafářová

Doubles main draw entrants

Seeds 

 1 Rankings as of 24 April 2017.

Other entrants 
The following pairs received wildcards into the main draw:
  Tereza Mihalíková /  Chantal Škamlová
  Tereza Smitková /  Anastasia Zarycká

Finals

Singles 

  Mona Barthel defeated  Kristýna Plíšková 2–6, 7–5, 6–2

Doubles 

  Anna-Lena Grönefeld /  Květa Peschke defeated  Lucie Hradecká /  Kateřina Siniaková 6–4, 7–6(7–3)

External links 
 Official website

 
J&T Banka Prague Open
J&T Banka
2017